PFC Spartak Plovdiv is a Bulgarian football club based in Plovdiv, which currently plays in the third tier of Bulgarian football, the Third League. The club was established in 1947 and folded its senior team in 2016, before being 'refounded' in 2017. Spartak currently plays its home matches at the 3,000-seat Todor Diev Stadium in the Kichuk Parizh district of Plovdiv. The stadium is named after the club's all-time greatest player Todor Diev.

Established in 1947, following the communist takeover in Bulgaria, Spartak was first enrolled in the second tier in 1952, before achieving promotion to the A Group a year later. Spartak has won two major honors, the Bulgarian Cup in 1958 and the league title in 1963. Spartak also participated in the Balkans Cup, where the team has finished as runner-up. The club has played a total of 17 seasons in the top tier A Group, most recently in 1997.

History 

Spartak was founded on 15 November 1947, evolving from three earlier Plovdiv clubs – Levski, Septemvri and Udarnik. The club name is a reference to the Roman slave hero Spartacus. This reference also explains the club's nickname – The Gladiators. The first team colours of the club were chosen the same year, and soon Spartak was characterized by a blue, red and white check jersey. These colors have remained throughout the club’s history, with various patterns used over the years.

The 1950s and 1960s were Spartak's golden age, spending that time in the A PFG. The club won the Bulgarian Cup in 1958, beating Minyor Pernik in the final. This was Spartak’s first major trophy in club history. In the 1961–62 season, Spartak finished as runners-up, behind CSKA Sofia. Spartak finished three points above city rivals Botev Plovdiv, in a closely fought battle for the title. Spartak’s Todor Diev finished as the top goalscorer that season, with 26 goals. coming second the previous year.

As league champions the previous season, the club participated in the European Cup competition for the first time in 1963-64 against  FK Partizani Tirana (0:1, 3:1) and vs PSV (0:1, 0:0). The second continental participation was in Inter-Cities Fairs Cup 1966-67 vs S.L. Benfica (1:1, 0:3). In 1964, Spartak reached the Balkans Cup final, losing to FC Rapid București after two legs – 1:1 at home and 0:2 away.

In 1967, Spartak was merged with SSK Akademik and Botev Plovdiv into a new club – AFD Trakia. An independent Spartak did not re-emerge until 1982. The club spent the period from 1982 to 1994 in the second and third divisions. In the 1993–94 season, Spartak finished 2nd in B PFG, and qualified again for the A PFG, after 27 years of absence from top football. But two seasons later, the team was relegated again to the B PFG. The club merged in 1998 with Komatevo Sokol`94 and were renamed Spartak-S`94. This remained the club's official name until the 2001–02 season.

Spartak dissolved its senior squad in 2016, due to financial problems. In 2017, the club was restored, starting from the fourth tier of football, Regional A OFG Plovdiv. In the same year, the club introduced an updated crest, displaying the helmet of Spartacus, after whom the club is named. In 2020, the club promoted to the Third League, but was relegated the next season. After one year, Spartak again reached the Third League.

League positions

Honours

Domestic
First League:
  Winners (1): 1962–63
  Runners-up (1): 1961–62

Bulgarian Cup:
  Winners (1): 1958
  Runners-up (2): 1955, 1959

European 
Balkans Cup:
  Runners-up (1): 1964

Players

European record

Kit manufacturers

References

External links
 Official club website
 Spartak Pd news and statistics

 
Association football clubs established in 1947
Spartak Plovdiv
1947 establishments in Bulgaria